The St. Anthony of Padua Cathedral  also called Oberá Cathedral it is a Catholic cathedral under the advocacy of St. Anthony of Padua, located in the central area of the city of Oberá, in the province of Misiones, in the South American country of Argentina.  Built in neo-Gothic style, it was designed by Austrian architect Anton Von Liebe and started to build in 1943.

In 2009, acquires the status of cathedral when the Diocese of Oberá was created  by Pope Benedict XVI. From 1960 he was completing the work, endowing the current fine and modern features. In 1982, he was placed a huge clock tower brought from Switzerland, which was donated by community members.

See also
List of cathedrals in Argentina
Roman Catholicism in Argentina
St. Anthony of Padua Cathedral

References

Roman Catholic cathedrals in Argentina
Oberá
Roman Catholic churches completed in 1943
Buildings and structures in Misiones Province
20th-century Roman Catholic church buildings in Argentina